Norlin Mommsen (born November 2, 1957) is the Iowa State Representative from the 97th District.  He has served as a Republican in the Iowa House of Representatives since 2015.

In February 2017, Rep. Mommsen threatened a teacher & constituent who spoke out against his stance on Chapter 20.

In February 2022, Rep. Mommsen sponsored a bill which would have required Iowa public schools to install cameras in every classroom so parents could watch the livestreams. The bill was tabled because it lacked the votes to clear a House subcommittee. While explaining his disappointment that the bill had stalled, Rep. Mommsen said, “I think what is important is the conversation takes place and that's what I was trying to provoke here was a conversation ... It's a big meat grinder and who knows what comes out the other end.”

References

1957 births
Living people
People from DeWitt, Iowa
People from Clinton, Iowa
Farmers from Iowa
Republican Party members of the Iowa House of Representatives
21st-century American politicians